"The Tate County School District exists to educate all students to be college and career ready, and to develop a lifelong love for learning."

The Tate County School District is a public school district based in Tate County, Mississippi (USA).

The district serves the town of Coldwater and the unincorporated communities of Sarah and Independence as well as most rural areas in Tate County.

Schools
East Tate Elementary School
Independence High School
Senatobia Tate County - Career & Technical Center
Coldwater Elementary School
Coldwater High School
Strayhorn Elementary School
Strayhorn High School

Demographics

2017-2018 & 2018-2019 School Year
Tate County School District contains 7 schools and 2,097 students. The district’s minority enrollment is 50%. Also, 99.1% of students are economically disadvantaged.

The student body at the schools served by Tate County School District is 56.8% White, 32% Black, 0.1% Asian or Asian/Pacific Islander, 6.6% Hispanic/Latino, 0% American Indian or Alaska Native, and 0% Native Hawaiian or other Pacific Islander. In addition, 4.5% of students are two or more races, and 0% have not specified their race or ethnicity.

Also, 50% of students are female, and 50% of students are male. At schools in Tate County School District, 99.1% of students are eligible to participate in the federal free and reduced price meal program and 5.1% of students are English language learners.

Within Tate County School District, 99.1% of teachers are licensed, and 82.7% have three or more years of experience. The student-to-teacher ratio is lower than the state average, at 14:1. The district has 4 full-time counsellors on staff.

Previous school years

Accountability statistics

See also
List of school districts in Mississippi

References

External links
 

Education in Tate County, Mississippi
School districts in Mississippi